Giovinazzo is a railway station in the Italian town of Giovinazzo, in the Province of Bari, Apulia. The station lies on the Adriatic Railway (Ancona–Lecce). The train services are operated by Trenitalia.

Train services
The station is served by the following service(s):

Regional services (Treno regionale) Foggia - Barletta - Bari

See also
Railway stations in Italy
List of railway stations in Apulia
Rail transport in Italy
History of rail transport in Italy

External links

This article is based upon a translation of the Italian language version as at May 2014.

Railway stations in Apulia
Buildings and structures in the Province of Bari